NGC 769 is a spiral galaxy located in the constellation Triangulum about 197 million light years from the Milky Way. It was discovered by the American astronomer Truman Safford in 1866.

See also 
 List of NGC objects (1–1000)

References

External links 
 

Spiral galaxies
Triangulum (constellation)
769
007537